Moseley is a suburb of south Birmingham, England,  south of the city centre. The area is a popular cosmopolitan residential location and leisure destination, with a number of bars and restaurants. The area also has a number of boutiques and other independent retailers.

It is located within the Moseley ward of the city, in the constituency of Hall Green. Historically it lay within Worcestershire.

History
Moseley was listed in the Domesday Book of 1086 as Museleie.

St. Mary's Church, Moseley was licensed by the Bishop of Worcester (authorised by Pope Innocent VII) in February 1405, and the 600th anniversary was celebrated in 2005 with a series of special events. In 2012 the church bells which had been named as the worst sounding in the country were replaced. Moseley itself developed around a Victorian shopping area known as Moseley Village.

Moseley Hall was rebuilt in parkland in the late 1700s and rebuilt by 1795 after being set on fire during rioting in 1791. It was donated in 1891 to the City of Birmingham by Richard Cadbury and now forms part of Moseley hall hospital.

Spring Hill College (Moseley School), a Gothic revival construction built in 1857, is located in the south of the district. Former pupils include comedian Jasper Carrott and musician Bev Bevan of the Electric Light Orchestra.

St. Anne's Church, Moseley was opened in 1874.

Moseley was served by Moseley railway station from 1867 to 1941. It was opened by the Midland Railway on the Camp Hill line. A previously named Moseley Station on the same line changed its name to Kings Heath Station upon the opening of the station.

Moseley and the surrounding areas were much developed after 1910, being built upon the once extensive farm land that was predominant in this area. The new properties being mostly of large houses, designed to cater for the Edwardian middle-class families that settled in the suburbs surrounding Birmingham's industrial centre. These large houses relied upon at least one servant or "tweeny" as they were often termed, to help the lady of the house run the household. With the advent of the First World War, staff were hard to find to maintain houses of this size. The heating bills and high maintenance made them unpopular after the war and many were split into flats to cater for the requirements of the expanding working population who moved from the city centre as extensive redevelopment took place in the 1960s.

In some respects Moseley and the surrounding area suffered a serious decline in the last part of the 20th century. Much property fell into neglect, and problems with crime, drugs and prostitution became commonplace in the areas bordering Balsall Heath. During this same period, however, with a great deal of cheap accommodation on offer, it is arguable that Moseley also enjoyed its most creative and cosmopolitan phase as the focus of artistic and student communities. In 1970s, the small triangular shaped green in the heart of Moseley village, which was then home to the underground public toilets, was a convenient meeting place for local youth, and was known as "Bog Island".

Today Moseley is one of the more affluent suburbs in Birmingham, although parts of north Moseley continue to suffer deprivation. The area has a mixture of residential properties, with some streets being among the most expensive in the city and others consisting largely of social housing and other rented accommodation.

Local band Ocean Colour Scene flourished in the mid-1990s British Britpop–indie scene with songs such as "The Riverboat Song", inspired by locations within the suburb of Moseley. Their most successful album (in terms of weeks on chart) was Moseley Shoals. Moseley is also the birthplace of Nick Rhodes of Duran Duran.

The suburb is the spiritual home of the great Moseley Rugby Football Club, regular cup finalists in the 1970s and 80s, and still regularly hosting one of the top 14 games in the country. Their new home is a few yards from the Moseley border at Billesley.

The politician Joseph Chamberlain had his Birmingham residence at Highbury, on the edge of Moseley. The property was entrusted to the city after Chamberlain's death and is currently used as a conference venue and location for civil ceremonies.

Literature
J. R. R. Tolkien spent his early years in Moseley, living close to Sarehole Mill in Hall Green before moving to the site now occupied by Shades Music off the Alcester Road. Sarehole Mill is believed to have been his inspiration for the tranquil Shire in The Lord of the Rings.  He also drew inspiration from Moseley Bog for the landscape of Middle-earth.

Planning permission has been acquired for the erection on Moseley Green of a  statue of Treebeard, an Ent from The Lord of the Rings, made by Tolkien's great-nephew, Tim Tolkien.

Local author, Jonathan Coe has drawn on Moseley for inspiration, including the suburb in scenes in his books The Rotters' Club and The Closed Circle.

Sport
Moseley has a rich history of success in Rugby Union. Its most famous team is Moseley Rugby Football Club, who were one of Europe's best teams in the late 1960s to the 1980s. Notable players include Sam Doble, J. F. Byrne, Peter Cranmer, Alain Rolland, Mike Teague and Victor Ubogu.

The Moseley Wanderers team of 1900 won the Silver Medal in the Rugby Union competition at the 1900 Olympics.

Present
Today, a monthly Farmers' Market in Moseley - set up by the Moseley Neighbourhood Forum- has won various awards including best FARMA Certified Urban Farmers' Market 2009 and in 2009 local farmer Dominic Butler won the Most Unique Produce award with his micro blue beetroots. Similarly, Moseley has a well defined and established community spirit and ethos, exemplified by Moseley Neighbourhood Forum - a neighbourhood forum - that works to develop the area for the betterment of everyone. The Moseley Society exists to protect the heritage of the area; meetings of the Society discuss and debate a wide range of local issues and the interests of its residents.

The Moseley Community Development Trust (CDT) invests in the social and physical capital of the area. Established with funding from charitable trust funds and with the support of the Moseley and Kings Heath Ward Committee, the CDT is now managing a series of initiatives to improve the environment of Moseley.

It has its own monthly magazine, Moseley B13 (formerly Birmingham 13), reporting on local events and personalities.  It has been printing since May 1973.

A group of volunteers have formed Moseley in Bloom (MiB). Much like the Moseley Community Development Trust, the group undertake many projects which look at the greener issues around Moseley. Many projects take place throughout the year to enhance the landscape of Moseley as well as renovate dilapidated areas.

Every summer Moseley hosts Moseley Festival, a festival of arts and culture that sees people in the community come together and hold a series of music, art, food, cultural and sporting events.

Moseley Folk Festival happens later in the year, and attracts big names from the world of folk. Moseley Jazz, Funk & Soul Festival takes place in Moseley Park during the summer as well. Moseley also has its own literary festival, Pow-Wow LitFest, which has taken place annually at the Prince of Wales pub since 2011.

Moseley is also home to many pubs, restaurants and cafés.

In 2015 Moseley was named as the "best urban place to live" by The Sunday Times, with the newspaper citing its 'Arts and Crafts', 'Bohemian culture' and 'Victorian Architecture' as reasons to live in the suburb. This award followed its being highlighted by The Guardian in 2013 as a place to move, with similar reasons being cited.
The Guardian also pointed out that if HS2 is built it would be the ideal place for a wealthy London worker to live.

Education
Moseley has two secondary schools, Moseley School, a language college and Queensbridge School, an Arts College. It also has several Primary schools such as Moseley C of E Primary School a one form entry school that has connections with St. Mary's Church and Park Hill Primary School on Alcester Road and St Martin de Porres Catholic Primary School.

Moseley is also home to Uffculme School, an all age special school for children on the Autistic Spectrum.

Moseley also has Fox Hollies School.

Notable residents

Many people who have been born, lived or worked in Moseley have made important contributions, a few of the more high-profile ones are:
Kabir Ali, Worcestershire & England cricketer
Edward Bach, Doctor, best known for developing a range of remedies called the Bach flower remedies.
Dan Bull, Rapper and songwriter
Ali Campbell, Singer UB40
Austen Chamberlain MP, Statesman, Lord Mayor of Birmingham, philanthropist and Nobel Peace Prize winner.
Neville Chamberlain, Prime Minister, MP and Lord Mayor of Birmingham (declared World War II)
Carl Chinn, Historian, radio presenter, newspaper columnist, and media personality
Alan Cottrell, Metallurgist and physicist.
Fyfe Dangerfield, Musician, solo artist and lead singer of the Guillemots
Roger Jon Ellory, Author
Simon Fowler, Musician and lead singer of Ocean Colour Scene
Claudia Jessie, Actress
Trish Keenan, Songwriter, musician and lead singer of Broadcast
Frederick W. Lanchester, Pioneer of the motor car
Joanne Malin, TV presenter, co-presenter of Central Tonight
Herbert Mason MC, Film director, producer, actor, stage manager, choreographer, production manager and army officer in World War I
Nick Rhodes, Keyboardist for Duran Duran
Brian Travers, Saxophone UB40
J. R. R. Tolkien, Author of The Hobbit and The Lord of the Rings

References

External links

 Moseley Society
 Moseley Forum - the neighbourhood forum for the village of Moseley
 Moseley in Bloom - Moseley volunteers growing a cleaner, greener community
 

 
Areas of Birmingham, West Midlands
Conservation areas in England